The Oxford Dictionary of English (ODE) is a single-volume English dictionary published by Oxford University Press, first published in 1998 as The New Oxford Dictionary of English (NODE). The word "new" was dropped from the title with the Second Edition in 2003. This dictionary is not based on the Oxford English Dictionary (OED) and should not be mistaken for a new or updated version of the OED.  It is a completely new dictionary which strives to represent as faithfully as possible the current usage of English words.
The Revised Second Edition contains 355,000 words, phrases, and definitions, including biographical references and thousands of encyclopaedic entries. The Third Edition was published in August 2010, with some new words, including "vuvuzela".

It is currently the largest single-volume English-language dictionary published by Oxford University Press, but is much smaller than the comprehensive Oxford English Dictionary, which is published in multiple volumes.

Editorial principles and practices
The first editor, Judy Pearsall, wrote in the introduction that it is based on a modern understanding of language and is derived from a corpus of contemporary English usage. For example, the editors did not discourage split infinitives, but instead justified their use in some contexts.  The first edition was based on bodies of texts such as the British National Corpus and the citation database of the Oxford Reading Programme.

The dictionary "views the language from the perspective that English is a world language".  A network of consultants provide extensive coverage of English usage from the United States to the Caribbean and New Zealand.

A more unusual decision was to omit pronunciations of common, everyday words, contrary to the practice of most large dictionaries.  The International Phonetic Alphabet (IPA) is used to present pronunciations, which are based on Received Pronunciation.

The Second Edition added over 3,000 new words, senses and phrases drawn from the Oxford English Corpus.

The New Oxford American Dictionary is the American version of the Oxford Dictionary of English, with substantial editing and uses a diacritical respelling scheme rather than the IPA system.

The third editions of both texts were published in 2010, and form the basis of the ongoing electronic versions of the dictionaries. Both are edited by Angus Stevenson, who contributed to the first edition of the Oxford Dictionary of English.

Publications

The New Oxford Dictionary of English
First edition: 350,000 entries (including 12,000 encyclopaedic entries and 52,000 scientific and technical words). CD-ROM supports Windows 95/NT and above. CD-ROM produced by Versaware. CD-ROM includes links to Versaware.
Hardcover+CD edition (/):
1st? impression (1998-09-??)
Shanghai Foreign Language Education Press paperback edition (新牛津英语辞典) (/)
1st? impression (2000-01-01)
?th impression (2001-8-2)
CD edition (The New Oxford Dictionary Of English on CD-ROM) (ASIN B00004UCXV):
1st? impression (2000-07-19)
CD edition (The Pop-Up New Oxford Dictionary Of English): Includes iFinger version 2.0.
1st? impression (2000-07-19)

New Oxford Dictionary of English
New edition
Hardcover edition (/):
1st? impression (2001-10-01)

Oxford Dictionary of English
Second Edition – 2003
Second Edition, Revised – 2005
hardcover edition
Kindle edition (//ASIN B0047T86G0)
?th impression (2010-10-19)
Third edition: The Third Edition is available online via Oxford Dictionaries Online, as well as in print. The online version is updated every three months. Oxford Dictionaries Online also includes the New Oxford American Dictionary, Oxford Thesaurus of English, Oxford American Writer's Thesaurus and grammar and usage resources. The online version added more than 80,000 words from the OED in August 2015. Includes nearly 100,000 headwords, with 11,000 proper names, over 350,000 words and phrases and definitions, 11,000 encyclopaedic entries, 68,000 explanations.
Hardcover edition (/): Includes 12-month access to Oxford Dictionaries Online.
1st? impression (2010-09-15)
Android version: Published by MobiSystems, Inc. Premium version includes unlimited dictionary use, audio pronunciation, regular content updates, offline mode, priority support, ad-free experience. 
Version 7.1.191 (2016): Support for Android 7. Improved Camera search and support for 18 new languages. 
Version 9.1.284 (2017): The latest Oxford word database, fully optimized support for Android 8, integrated look-up feature from other Android apps, audio optimization - smaller audio files size.
Version 10.0.399 (2018): Android 9 support and introduction of offline mode. 
Version 11.2.546 (2019): Support for Android 10. Contains the latest 2019 Oxford University Press word database and improved audio pronunciation quality. 
Version 11.7.712 (2020): The latest 2020 Oxford University Press word database. New dictionary entries, multiple-select in Favourites, more than 50 words in Recent list. 
iOS version: Published by MobiSystems, Inc. Premium version includes unlimited dictionary use, audio pronunciation, regular content updates, offline mode, priority support, ad-free experience.
Version 10.0.6 (2017): The latest Oxford University Word Database. Audio optimization - smaller audio files, 4 new colorful themes.
Version 10.0.10 (2018): Includes the newest version of the Oxford University Press audio database.
Version 11.2.2 (2019): Support for iOS 13. New 2019 Oxford University word database. 
Version 12.4.191 (2020): The latest 2020 Oxford University Word Database. New dictionary entries, improved quality of audio pronunciation.

Oxford Dictionaries of English and Concise Oxford Thesaurus
It is a compilation that includes Oxford Dictionaries of English and Concise Oxford Thesaurus.
3rd edition
Android version: Published by MobiSystems, Inc. Premium version includes offline mode, priority support, ad-free experience.
Version 7.1.191 (2016): Support for Android 7. Improved Camera search.
Version 9.1.284 (2017): Fully optimized support for Android 8. Improved search speed and integrated look-up feature from other Android apps.
Version 10.0.409 (2018): Android 9 support and introduction of offline mode. 
Version 11.0.504 (2019): Updated word database and improved audio pronunciation quality.
Version 11.4.607 (2020): The latest 2020 Oxford University Press word database.
iOS version: Published by MobiSystems, Inc. Premium version includes offline mode, priority support, ad-free experience.
Version 8.1 (2016): Optimized for iOS 8, new UI. 
Version 10.0.1 (2017): Support for iOS 11. 
Version 10.0.11 (2018): New colorful design, delete and sort entries with Favorites and Recent list. 
Version 10.0.17 (2019): iOS 12 support.

Oxford Dictionaries Quick Search
It is a dictionary app based on contents from Oxford Dictionary of English and New Oxford American Dictionary.
3rd edition
Android version: Published by Oxford University Press ELT.
Version 1.2.0 (Android 2.3.3, 2014-11-07): Supports landscape mode.
iOS version: Published by Oxford University Press ELT.
Version 1.1.1 (iOS 5.0, 2014-03-01):

Oxford Thesaurus of English
Third edition: Includes 600,000 synonyms and antonyms, 35,000 example sentences.
Hardcover edition (/): Includes 12-month access to Oxford Dictionaries Online.
1st? impression (2009-09-15)

See also
Concise Oxford English Dictionary (COED)
New Oxford American Dictionary (NOAD)
Oxford Advanced Learner's Dictionary (OALD)
Oxford English Dictionary (OED)
Shorter Oxford English Dictionary (SOED)
Australian Oxford Dictionary (AOD)
Canadian Oxford Dictionary (CanOD)

Notes

References
The New Oxford Dictionary of English, Oxford University Press, 2001. Ed. Judy Pearsall. 
Oxford Dictionary of English, Oxford University Press, 2003. Ed. Catherine Soanes, Angus Stevenson. , .
Oxford Dictionary of English, Revised Edition, Oxford University Press, C. Soanes and A. Stevenson, Publication date: 11 August 2005, hard cover, 270 × 208 mm.

External links
Oxford Dictionaries Online online version published from 2010
Oxford Dictionary of English
World Wide Words: Oxford Dictionary of English
Oxfore References pages: 3rd edition
Google Play pages: Oxford Dictionary of English, Oxford Dictionaries of English and Concise Oxford Thesaurus
iTunes pages: ODOE iOS, ODOE OS X
MobiSystems pages: Oxford Dictionary of English
WordWeb pages: Oxford Dictionary of English for Mac OS, Oxford Dictionary of English (Windows)
Oxford Dictionaries Quick Search
Google Play pages: Oxford Dictionaries - Search
iTunes pages: iOS

1998 non-fiction books
2003 non-fiction books
English dictionaries
Oxford dictionaries